Alive: 20 Years Later is a 1993 documentary film produced, directed and written by Jill Fullerton-Smith and narrated by Martin Sheen.

Content
The documentary focused on the lives (20 years later) of the 16  Uruguayan  survivors of the airplane crash of Uruguayan Air Force Flight 571, which crashed into the Andes mountains on October 13, 1972. It also discussed their participation in the production of the 1993 feature film Alive.

Format
The documentary first aired on CBS on January 30, 1993.  It was released as a companion to Alive: The Miracle of the Andes. It is also included as an extra on the DVD of the 30th Anniversary Edition of Alive: The Miracle of the Andes.

See also
 Nando Parrado
 Piers Paul Read
 Alive: The Story of the Andes Survivors
 Miracle in the Andes: 72 Days on the Mountain and My Long Trek Home

References

External links 
 

1993 films
American documentary films
American aviation films
Documentary films about aviation accidents or incidents
Rugby union films
Uruguayan Air Force Flight 571
1993 documentary films
Films about aviation accidents or incidents
Works about cannibalism
1990s English-language films
1990s American films